Let's Bottle Bohemia is the second album by the Irish indie/rock band The Thrills. It was produced and mixed by Dave Sardy. The album went platinum in Ireland in 2005, debuting at #1. In the UK, the album debuted at #9 and remained in the charts for 4 weeks.

In an interview in 2004, lead singer Conor Deasy described the band's upcoming second album:

Track listing
 "Tell Me Something I Don't Know" – 3:56
 "Whatever Happened To Corey Haim?" – 3:34
 "Faded Beauty Queens" (guest appearance by Peter Buck on mandolin & Van Dyke Parks on accordion) – 3:40
 "Saturday Night" – 2:31
 "Not for All the Love in the World" – 4:06
 "Our Wasted Lives" – 3:46
 "You Can't Fool Old Friends with Limousines" – 3:12
 "Found My Rosebud" – 4:19
 "The Curse of Comfort" (guest appearance by Peter Buck on guitar) – 3:01
 "The Irish Keep Gate-crashing" – 3:05 / "A City Of Long Nights" (hidden track) – 7:02 (both songs: Strings arranged and conducted by Van Dyke Parks)

Singles
 "Whatever Happened To Corey Haim?" (August 30, 2004)
 "Not for All the Love in the World" (November 15, 2004)
 "The Irish Keep Gate-crashing" (March 21, 2005)

References

2004 albums
The Thrills albums
Virgin Records albums
Albums produced by Dave Sardy